The European Association of Geochemistry (EAG) is a pan-European organization founded to promotes geochemical research. The EAG organizes conferences, meetings and educational courses for geochemists in Europe, including the Goldschmidt Conference which it co-sponsors with the North American Geochemical Society.

Awards
The European Association of Geochemistry gives the following awards:
 The Urey Medal (European Association of Geochemistry) for outstanding contributions advancing geochemistry over a career.
 The Science Innovation Award for an important and innovative breakthrough in geochemistry.
 The Houtermans Award for exceptional contributions to geochemistry made by scientists under 35 years old.
 Geochemical Fellows –  Awarded annually by the Geochemical Society and the European Association of Geochemistry to outstanding scientists who have, over some years, made a major contribution to the field of geochemistry.

Publications
The European Association of Geochemistry publishes, co-publishes, or sponsors the following:
 Geochemical Perspectives – 4 issues a year
 Geochemical Perspectives Letters – an open access journal
 Elements: An International Magazine of Mineralogy, Geochemistry, and Petrology – 6 issues a year
 Chemical Geology – 24 issues a year

References

External links 
 European Association of Geochemistry homepage

Geochemistry organizations
Geochemistry